James Hillhouse (October 20, 1754 – December 29, 1832) was an American lawyer, real estate developer, and politician from New Haven, Connecticut. He represented the state in both chambers of the US Congress. From February to March 1801, Hillhouse briefly served as President pro tempore of the United States Senate.

Early life
Hillhouse was born in Montville in the Connecticut Colony, the son of William Hillhouse and Sarah (Griswold) Hillhouse. At the age of seven, he was adopted by his childless uncle and aunt, James Abraham and Mary Lucas Hillhouse. He attended the Hopkins Grammar School in New Haven, Connecticut, and graduated from Yale College in 1773. At Yale, he was a member of the Linonian Society. He studied law and was admitted to the bar in 1775, and practiced law in New Haven.

Revolutionary War
During the Revolutionary War, Hillhouse served as captain of the Second 
Company of the Governor's Foot Guard. During the successful British invasion of New Haven on July 5, 1779, he commanded troops alongside Aaron Burr, with Yale student volunteers.

Career
Hillhouse was a member of the Connecticut House of Representatives from 1780 to 1785. He was a member of the Connecticut council of Assistants from 1789 to 1790 and was elected as a US representative from Connecticut at large for the Second, Third, and Fourth Congresses and served from March 4, 1791, to his resignation, in the fall of 1796.

Elected as a US senator on May 12, 1796, to fill the vacancy caused by the resignation of Oliver Ellsworth, Hillhouse was re-elected in 1797, 1803, and 1809, and he served from December 1796 to June 10, 1810, when he resigned. During the Sixth Congress he was President pro tempore of the Senate.

In 1803, Hillhouse and several other New England politicians proposed secession of New England from the union because of the growing influence of Jeffersonian Democrats, especially after the Louisiana Purchase, which would further diminish Northern and Federalist influence.

Hillhouse was elected a member of the American Antiquarian Society in 1813.

In 1814, he was a Connecticut delegate to the Hartford Convention, and he was treasurer of Yale College from 1782 to 1832.

He died in 1832 in New Haven and is interred at the city's Grove Street Cemetery.

Hillhouse was a slaveholder.

Legacy
Hillhouse made major contributions to the beautification of New Haven. He was active in the drive to plant the elm trees, which gave New Haven the nickname of "Elm City." Hillhouse Avenue and James Hillhouse High School, in New Haven, are named after him.

He was a nephew of Matthew Griswold and an uncle of Thomas Hillhouse.

References

External links

James Hillhouse High School website

 

1754 births
1832 deaths
18th-century American politicians
19th-century American politicians
18th-century American lawyers
Members of the Connecticut General Assembly Council of Assistants (1662–1818)
Members of the Connecticut House of Representatives
United States senators from Connecticut
Presidents pro tempore of the United States Senate
Yale College alumni
Connecticut militiamen in the American Revolution
Burials at Grove Street Cemetery
People from Montville, Connecticut
Businesspeople from New Haven, Connecticut
Federalist Party United States senators
Federalist Party members of the United States House of Representatives from Connecticut
Military personnel from Connecticut
Members of the American Antiquarian Society
People of colonial Connecticut